Emily Beatty (born 18 August 1993) is an Ireland women's field hockey international. She was a member of the Ireland team that played in the 2018 Women's Hockey World Cup final. Beatty has also won Irish Senior Cup and Women's Irish Hockey League titles with UCD.

Early years and education
Beatty was educated at Alexandra College and University College Dublin. Her fellow students at Alexandra College included Deirdre Duke. Beatty and Duke played together as teammates in both the Alexandra College field hockey and women's association football teams. Beatty completed her Leaving Cert in 2012. Between 2012 and 2016 she attended University College Dublin and gained a degree in Psychology. Beatty is currently studying at the Royal College of Surgeons in Ireland.

Association football
Beatty played women's association football for Alexandra College, winning Leinster titles. She also played for Templeogue United, St Josephs AFC, Peamount United and UCD. She was also a member of Leinster Under-15 and Republic of Ireland Under-17 development squads.

Field hockey

Early years
Beatty began playing field hockey with Alexandra College. In 2011, along with Deirdre Duke, she was a member of the Alexandra College team that won the Leinster Schoolgirls' Senior Cup. In the final they defeated a St. Andrew's College team that included Gillian Pinder. She also played for the Alexandra College alumni teams, Old Alex.

UCD
Beatty started playing for UCD during the 2012–13 season. In her first season, she helped UCD win the 2012 Chilean Cup  and reach the final of the Irish Senior Cup. During the 2013–14 season, Beatty was a member of a UCD squad
that included Katie Mullan, Gillian Pinder, Deirdre Duke, Nicola Evans, Anna O'Flanagan and Chloe Watkins. UCD subsequently won the Chilean Cup, the Irish Senior Cup, the Leinster Division One and their first Women's Irish Hockey League title. In the Chilean Cup final, Beatty scored UCD's third goal in a 3–1 win against Ulster Elks. Beatty also played and scored for UCD in the 2015 EuroHockey Club Champions Cup, scoring the winner in a 3–2 win against Canterbury Ladies.

KHC Dragons
During the 2016–17 season Beatty played for KHC Dragons. She was joined at the Dragons by former UCD teammate, Kate Lloyd.

Pembroke Wanderers
The 2017–18 season saw Beatty play for Pembroke Wanderers in the Women's Irish Hockey League. Her teammates at Wanderers included Gillian Pinder.

Ireland international
Together with Roisin Upton and Katie Mullan, Beatty represented Ireland at the 2010 Youth Olympic Games. In Ireland's opening game of the tournament, Beatty scored against the Netherlands in a 3–1 defeat. Beatty subsequently represented Ireland at Under-21 level  before making her senior Ireland debut on 22 June 2013 in a 3–2 defeat against Canada. Beatty went onto represent Ireland at the 2014 Women's Hockey Champions Challenge I, scoring twice in a 2–2 win Spain. Beatty was also a member of the Ireland team that won the 2015 Women's EuroHockey Championship II, scoring in the  5–0 win against the Czech Republic in the final. In June 2016 Beatty earned her 50th cap against Spain.

Beatty was originally selected as a non-travelling reserve for the 2018 Women's Hockey World Cup. She subsequently played in warm up games against Japan, Italy and Chile, scoring the only goal in the latter game. At the start of the tournament, Beatty was on holidays in West Cork and had planned to travel to London to watch the final stages. After Megan Frazer was injured in the semi-final against Spain, Beatty was called into the squad. She was already in London when she received a call from Graham Shaw at 11.30 on the day of the final against the Netherlands. She then joined up with the rest of the Ireland squad and featured in the final.

Honours

Field hockey
Ireland
Women's Hockey World Cup
Runners Up: 2018
Women's EuroHockey Championship II
Winners: 2015
Women's Hockey Champions Challenge I
Runners Up: 2014
Women's Four Nations Cup
Runners Up: 2017
UCD
Women's Irish Hockey League
Winners: 2013–14 
Irish Senior Cup
Winners: 2013–14 
Runners Up: 2012–13
Chilean Cup
Winners: 2012, 2013
Alexandra College
Leinster Schoolgirls' Senior Cup
Winners: 2011

References

1993 births
Living people
Irish female field hockey players
Ireland international women's field hockey players
UCD Ladies' Hockey Club players
KHC Dragons players
Female field hockey forwards
Field hockey players at the 2010 Summer Youth Olympics
Republic of Ireland women's association footballers
Association footballers from County Dublin
Peamount United F.C. players
UCD Women's Soccer Club players
People educated at Alexandra College
Alumni of University College Dublin
Field hockey players from County Dublin
Women's association footballers not categorized by position
Alumni of the Royal College of Surgeons in Ireland
Women's Irish Hockey League players
Pembroke Wanderers Hockey Club players
Irish expatriate sportspeople in Belgium